Germán Rivero (born 12 March 1992 in Argentina) is an Argentinean footballer who now plays for Club Atlético Alvarado in his home country.

Career

Rivero started his senior career with CSD Flandria. In 2016. he signed for Club Plaza Colonia de Deportes in the Uruguayan Primera División, where he made seventeen league appearances and scored eight goals. After that, he played for Unión La Calera, Defensor Sporting, Apollon Smyrni, and Club Atlético Alvarado, where he now plays.

References

External links 
 The story of Germán Rivero: the Argentine champion with Plaza Colonia, the Uruguayan Leicester
 Germán Rivero: the return
 From the Argentine promotion to be the top scorer of the Uruguayan champion
 The 9 that went to C with Flandria and was champion in Uruguay

1992 births
Argentine footballers
Club Atlético Alvarado players
Living people
Association football forwards